Doyle New York is an American auction house and appraiser of fine art, jewelry, furniture, decorations and other items. It offers auctions throughout the year at its premises on the Upper East Side of Manhattan.

The firm was founded in 1962 by the late William Doyle as William Doyle Antiques. In 1973, it was incorporated as William Doyle Galleries, Inc. Since 2001, it has been doing business as Doyle New York.

In 2013, the company auctioned the furniture and art collection of Edward Koch, former mayor of New York City.

One of the most popular auctions is the Dogs in Art & Sporting Art held annually in the same week as the famous Westminster Kennel Club Dog Show.

References

External links 
 

American companies established in 1962
Retail companies established in 1962
Commercial buildings in Manhattan
Auction houses based in New York City
Upper East Side
Privately held companies based in New York City
1962 establishments in New York City